Lobogenesis contrasta is a species of moth of the family Tortricidae. It is found in Bolivia. The habitat consists of tropical cloud forests.

The length of the forewings is 6.8–8 mm. The forewings are white with pale yellow-tan overscaling. The hindwings are dingy pale yellow with pale grey-brown mottling.

Etymology
The species name refers to the contrast between the pale ground colour and the forewing pattern elements.

References

Moths described in 2000
Euliini